S. M. Laljan Basha ( – 15 August 2013), a politician, deputy chairman, and Vice President of the Telugu Desam Party, was a Member of the Parliament of India representing Andhra Pradesh in the Rajya Sabha (2002–2008), the upper house of the Indian Parliament. He was also elected Member of Parliament of India representing Guntur, an Andhra Pradesh constituency in Lok Sabha (1991–1996). He also acted as Chairman for Joint Parliament Committee for Waqf. . His younger brother S.M. Ziauddin contested four times for legislative elections and won two times. Jinnar tower in Guntur was built by Lal jan saheb (grandfather of S.M. Lal jan basha and S.M.Ziauddin)

Basha died in a road accident on 15 August 2013 when his vehicle rammed into the divider at Narkatpalli near Nalgonda on the Vijayawada Hyderabad national highway in the wee hours of 15 August 2013 on his way to Guntur.

References

External links
 Profile on Rajya Sabha website

1950s births
2013 deaths
India MPs 1991–1996
Lok Sabha members from Andhra Pradesh
Telugu Desam Party politicians
Rajya Sabha members from Andhra Pradesh
Road incident deaths in India
Telugu politicians